The 27th TCA Awards were presented by the Television Critics Association. Nick Offerman hosted the ceremony on August 6 at the Beverly Hilton Hotel.

Winners and nominees

Multiple wins 
The following shows received multiple wins:

Multiple nominations 
The following shows received multiple nominations:

References

External links
Official website
2011 TCA Awards at IMDb.com

2011 television awards
2011 in American television
TCA Awards ceremonies
TCA